Berakas Secondary School (abbreviated as ) is a government secondary school located in Bandar Seri Begawan, Brunei. The school provides secondary education leading up to GCE 'O' Level and IGCSE qualifications.

History 
Berakas Secondary School was established in 1971 as Berakas English School. In 1985, the school was renamed to as it is known today.

See also 
 List of secondary schools in Brunei

References 

Secondary schools in Brunei
Cambridge schools in Brunei